Roger Labric (12 February 1893 – 24 May 1962) was a French journalist (specialising in aviation and motor racing), cyclist and racing driver. In 1920 he started in the Tour de France, but did not finish the race.

It was he who entered the Bugatti 57G cars in the 1937 Le Mans 24 Hour race (which saw victory for Wimille and Benoist in one of the cars).

As well as contributing to specialist magazines and newspapers, he wrote several books: notably several histories of aviation in the First World War, a history of the Le Mans 24 Hour race and a biography of his friend, Robert Benoist.

Bibliography (possibly incomplete) 

 Les Champs Bleus (vie courante d'une escadrille de combat) - Edouard-Joseph éditeur, 1923
 Un le l'aviation - Cosmopolites, 1932
 Classe 14 - Cosmopolites, 1932
 On se bat dans l'air - Nouvellese Editions Latines, 1933
 L'Avion de Minuit - Nouvelles Editions Latines, 1935
 La Grande Escadrille - Causse, Graille & Castelnau, Montpellier, 1941
 L'Escadre invisible - Editions Chantal, 1943
 Gisele Parachutiste - Editions Lajeunesse, 1945
 Carnet de Vol - Editions du Pavois, Paris, 1944
 Maurice Arnoux - Technique du livre, 1946
 Memoires d'un Avion de Combat - Société Privée d'Impression et d'Edition, Paris, 1946
 Robert Benoist, Champion du Monde - Edicta, Paris, 1946
 Les 24 Heures du Mans - Histoire d'une grande bataille pacifique et sportive - l'Automobile Club de l'Ouest, 1949 (illustrations by Géo Ham)
 Si la course vous était contée - Nouvellese Editions Latines

References

1893 births
1962 deaths
French journalists
24 Hours of Le Mans drivers
French male non-fiction writers
20th-century French male writers